A sandglass is a device for measuring time, including:

Hourglass
Marine sandglass
Egg timer

It can also refer to:

Sandglass (TV series), a 1995 Korean drama series

See also
Hourglass (disambiguation)
Sandglaz, a task management app and competitor of Astrid and Wunderlist